Tragedy in the House of Habsburg is a 1924 German silent historical film directed by Alexander Korda and starring María Corda, Kálmán Zátony and Emil Fenyvessy. The film recounts the events of the 1889 Mayerling Incident in which the heir to the Austro-Hungarian Empire committed suicide. Studio filming was done in Berlin with location shooting in Vienna. The film cost $80,000 to make, but only earned back around half of this at the box office.

Cast
 María Corda as Baroness Vetsera
 Kálmán Zátony as Crown Prince Rudolf
 Emil Fenyvessy as Emperor Franz Joseph I of Austria
 Werner Schott as Lieutenant Corradini
 Arthur Bergen
 Hans Brausewetter
 Friedrich Kayßler
 Louis Ralph
 Mathilde Sussin
 Jakob Tiedtke
 Ferdinand von Alten

References

Bibliography
 Kulik, Karol. Alexander Korda: The Man Who Could Work Miracles. Virgin Books, 1990.

External links

1924 films
Films of the Weimar Republic
German historical drama films
German silent feature films
Films directed by Alexander Korda
Films set in Vienna
Films set in 1889
1920s historical drama films
Films produced by Alexander Korda
Biographical films about Austrian royalty
German black-and-white films
Rudolf, Crown Prince of Austria
Cultural depictions of Franz Joseph I of Austria
UFA GmbH films
1924 drama films
Films set in Austria-Hungary
Silent historical drama films
1920s German films
1920s German-language films